Temptation is the fourth studio album by American country singer-songwriter Shelby Lynne, released July 6, 1993. Two songs, "Tell Me I'm Crazy"and "I Need a Heart to Come Home To", were released as singles and one of the tracks, "I Need a Heart to Come Home To", featured on the soundtrack to Tony Scott's 1993 film True Romance.

Background and release
Following her first three albums, Lynne left her record label Epic and began working with Brent Maher. In a 2009 interview, she said of the move, "After Soft Talk, I knew I had to take control. Hell, if I wasn’t going to be embraced by country radio, I might as well make critically acclaimed albums! I wanted to cross genres and not make that silly-ass country pop." She went on to say, "I consider Temptation the real beginning of my career." Lynne co-wrote two songs on the album, the title track and "Some of That True Love".

Temptation was released on July 6, 1993 on Mercury Records and Morgan Creek. The album reached No. 55 on the US Billboard Country Albums chart and No. 21 on the Heatseekers Albums chart. Two songs from the album were released as singles: "Feelin' Kind of Lonely Tonight", which reached No. 69 on the US Hot Country Songs chart, and "Tell Me I'm Crazy", which failed to chart. "I Need a Heart to Come Home To" was included on the soundtrack of Tony Scott's 1993 film True Romance.

Reception

Writing for AllMusic, Thom Jurek praised the album and gave it a star-rating of four out of five. He noted that the album was markedly different from Lynne's previous albums Tough All Over (1990) and Soft Talk (1991) and described it as "hardcore jacked-up Western swing and big-band country". He cited "Temptation", "Don't Cry for Me" and "Some of That True Love" as highlights and summed up the review by calling the album "hip, sassy, and tough."

Track listing
"Temptation" (Shelby Lynne, Brent Maher, Jamie O'Hara) – 3:04
"Feelin' Kind of Lonely Tonight" (Maher, O'Hara) – 3:00
"Tell Me I'm Crazy" (Rory Bourke, Mike Reid) – 3:44
"Little Unlucky at Love" (Maher, O'Hara) – 3:01
"Some of That True Love" (Lynne, Maher, O'Hara) – 2:47
"The Rain Might Wash Your Love Away" (Maher, Don Potter, Don Schlitz) – 4:34
"Don't Cry for Me" (Maher) – 2:43
"I Need a Heart to Come Home To" (John Jarvis, Russell Smith) – 4:20
"Come a Little Closer" (Maher, O'Hara) – 3:15
"Where Do We Go from Here" (Maher, Potter, Reid) – 3:38

Personnel

Music
Jeff Bailey – Trumpet
Eddie Bayers – Drums
Ernie Collins – bass trombone
Paul Franklin – steel guitar
Dennis Good – trombone
Barry Green – trombone
Rob Hajacos – fiddle
Michael Haynes – trumpet
Randy Howard – fiddle
Shelby Lynne – lead vocals, background vocals 
Brent Mason – electric guitar
Chris McDonald – trombone
Craig Nelson – bass guitar, acoustic bass
Bobby Ogdin – piano
Don Potter – acoustic guitar
Billy Puett – tenor saxophone
Buddy Skipper – horn arrangements
Denis Solee – alto saxophone
George Tidwell – trumpet
Ron Tutt – drums

Production
Mills Logan – assistant engineer
Brent Maher – producer, engineer, mixing
Jim McKell – assistant engineer, mixing assistant
Glenn Meadows – mastering
Design
Daniela Federici – photography
Shannon Gibbons – stylist
Buddy Jackson – art direction
Sam Knight – design
Beth Lee – design
Lisa Jayne Storey – make-up, hair stylist

References

Chart performance

1993 albums
Mercury Records albums
Shelby Lynne albums
Albums produced by Brent Maher